Alina Kenzel (born 10 August 1997) is a German athlete specialising in the shot put. She won a gold medal at the 2016 World U20 Championships and a bronze at the 2017 European U23 Championships.

Her personal bests in the event are 18.21 metres outdoors (Rechberghausen 2018) and 17.68 metres indoors (Rochlitz 2017).

International competitions

References

1997 births
Living people
People from Konstanz
Sportspeople from Freiburg (region)
German female shot putters
World Athletics Championships athletes for Germany
German national athletics champions